A Dictionary of Canadianisms on Historical Principles (DCHP)  is a historical usage dictionary of words, expressions, or meanings which are native to Canada or which are distinctively characteristic of Canadian English  though not necessarily exclusive to Canada. The first edition was published by W. J. Gage Limited in 1967. The text of this first edition was scanned and  released as a free-access online dictionary in 2013. 

A second edition of A Dictionary of Canadianisms on Historical Principles (DCHP-2), was then created by expanding and partially revising the first edition's data set. DCHP-2 was published in 2017 as an academic project by the University of British Columbia, and is only available as a free-access online dictionary.

History
The first edition, edited by Walter S. Avis (ed.-in-chief), C. Crate, P. Drysdale, D. Leechman, M. H. Scargill, C. J. Lovell,  was published in 1967 after a period of about 12 years, and had a sizeable collection by C. J. Lovell at its base. W. J. Gage Publishers, the leading dictionary publisher for Canadian English (CanE) dictionaries at the time, contributed to the project (P. Drysdale was employed by Gage). In this way, the first edition (DCHP-1) was the result of both academia and a publishing house. The academic partners, headed by editor-in-chief Walter S. Avis, were given free hand. The result was a ground-breaking dictionary in several ways: the DCHP-1 was the first scholarly historical dictionary of a variety of English other than British English (the Oxford English Dictionary) or American English (the Dictionary of American English and A Dictionary of Americanisms), the two dominant varieties of English throughout the 20th century.

In 2006, after almost 40 years of existence without any updates, work on a new edition was started. Nelson Education Ltd., which had acquired Gage Ltd. and with it the rights to the DCHP-1 had been actively seeking collaborators in academia to produce a new edition of the DCHP-1. This project, DCHP-2, was proposed at a conference on Canadian English in January 2005, and formally commenced at the University of British Columbia's Department of English in August 2006, after a year of preparatory work. Since 2009, DCHP-2 has had no association with Nelson Ltd. or any other publisher and had been a purely academic project.

The second edition was edited by Stefan Dollinger (editor-in-chief) and  Margery Fee (associate editor) and includes features not part of the first edition: a six-way classification system for Canadianisms, the Dictionary Editing Tool, and the Bank of Canadian English (BCE), a quotation database. DCHP-2 was published in 2017 as an academic project by the University of British Columbia, and is only available as a free-access online dictionary.

Milestones
Completed in 2011 after automatic scanning and manual proofreading by a team of UBC students under the direction of Stefan Dollinger,  DCHP-1 was republished in open access as of 2013, thanks to Nelson Ltd. (Dollinger et al. 2013), and is available as a free website, DCHP-1 Online.

DCHP-2, fully revised and expanded, is published 2017 (thanks to a three-year SSHRC Insight Grant, Competition 2012, Insight Grants).

Release of DCHP-2 
DCHP-2, the second, reconceptualized and updated edition was released online on 17 March 2017.

The launch coincided with the 57th anniversary of Charles J. Lovell's passing, the founding editor of DCHP-1. DCHP-1 was launched as a Centennial project; DCHP-2 was launched as a Sesquicentennial contribution with the goal of lifting the discussion about Canadianisms, and about Canadian English more generally, on an empirically sounder footing.

Creating DCHP-2
The process started with the scanning and digitization of the first edition of the dictionary (DCHP-1). The online version of DCHP-1 was made publicly accessible in 2013. The main data collection phase for the DCHP-2 lasted from 2007 to 2010 and included 36,000 new citations derived from the 7,000 new potential headwords found in The Canadian Oxford Dictionary and other sources. Potential headwords and citations were cross-checked with other varieties of English using web data and entered into the Bank of Canadian English, a quotation filing system, to be proofread and edited.  The potential headwords and citations were then classified into one of the six categories of Canadianisms according to their distinctive histories in Canada, cultural significance, or usage frequency.

Accessing DCHP-2 
DCHP-2 is accessible at here. It is, like the current edition of the OED, an online-only publication; there is no hardcopy available at this point.

Reception 
The Toronto Star referred to it as a great "birthday gift for the nation" of Canada, The Globe and Mail lauded its detail (e.g. the entry on eh, which is almost 5000 words long) and the CBC The National Newscast featured DCHP-2 in April 2017 as the topic of its cultural news item of the day.

See also
List of Canadian English dictionaries
Dictionary of American English
Dictionary of Americanisms
Dictionary of American Regional English
Oxford English Dictionary

Notes

References

Cassidy, Frederick G. and Joan Houston Hall (eds.). 1985, 1991, 1996, 2002, in prep. Dictionary of American Regional English. Volumes I–V. Cambridge, MA: Belknap Press of Harvard University Press.
Craigie, William and James R. Hulbert (eds.). 1968 [1938–44]. A Dictionary of American English on Historical Principles. 4 volumes. Chicago: University of Chicago Press.
DA = Dictionary of Americanisms. See Mathews (ed.) 1951. 
DAE = A Dictionary of American English on Historical Principles. See Craigie and Hulbert (eds.) 1968 [1938–44].
DARE = Dictionary of American Regional English. See Cassidy and Hall (eds.) 1985, 1991, 1996, 2002, in prep.
OED = Oxford English Dictionary
Dollinger, Stefan. 2006. "Towards a fully revised and extended edition of the Dictionary of Canadianisms on Historical Principles (DCHP-2): background, challenges, prospects". HSL/SHL – Historical Sociolinguistics/Sociohistorical Linguistics (Leiden, NL). 6. http://www.let.leidenuniv.nl/hsl_shl/DCHP-2/DCHP-2/DCHP-2.htm, 1 Sept. 2006.

Further reading
Dollinger, Stefan. 2006. Towards a fully revised Dictionary of Canadianisms on Historical Principles. https://www.academia.edu/4591720/Towards_a_fully_revised_and_extended_edition_of_the_Dictionary_of_Canadianisms_on_Historical_Principles_DCHP-2_background_challenges_prospects
Mathews, Mitford M. (ed.). 1951. Dictionary of Americanisms. Chicago: University of Chicago Press.
Orsman, H. W. (ed.). 1997. Dictionary of New Zealand English: A Dictionary of New Zealandisms on Historical Principles. Auckland: Oxford University Press.
Ramson, W. S. et al. (eds.). 1988. Australian National Dictionary. A Dictionary of Australianisms on Historical Principles. Melbourne: Oxford University Press.
Silva, Penny et al. (eds.). 1996. A Dictionary of South African English on Historical Principles. Oxford: Oxford University Press.
Dollinger, Stefan, Laurel J. Brinton, and Margery Fee (2012). "Revising The Dictionary of Canadianisms on Historical Principles: A Progress Report, 2006—(April) 2012." Dictionaries: Journal of the Dictionary Society of North America 33: 164-178. Print.
Dollinger, Stefan. (2017). "Revising the Dictionary of Canadianisms on Historical Principles: World Englishes and linguistic variation in real-time". In The Routledge Handbook of Lexicography, ed. by Pedro A. Fuertes Olivera, 367-382. London Routledge.

External links
, DCHP-1 and DCHP-2 online

English dictionaries
1967 non-fiction books
Canadian English
Online English dictionaries